Vlatko is a masculine given name of South Slavic origin.

Notable people with the name include:

Vlatko Andonovski (born 1976), football manager
Vlatko Blažević (born 1994), Croatian football player
Vlatko Čančar (born 1997), Slovenian professional basketball player
Vlatko Đolonga (born 1976), Croatian football defender
Vlatko Drobarov (born 1992), Macedonian professional footballer
Vlatko Dulić (1943–2015), Croatian theatre, TV and film actor, theatre director
Vlatko Glavaš (born 1962), Bosnian football coach and a former player
Vlatko Gošev (born 1974), retired Macedonian football midfielder
Vlatko Grozdanoski (born 1983), Macedonian footballer
Vlatko Hercegović (1428–1489), the second and the last Herzog of Saint Sava
Vlatko Ilievski (1985–2018), Macedonian pop rock singer and actor
Vlatko Konjevod (1923–2005), Yugoslav and later Bosnian football manager and player
Vlatko Kostov (born 1965), former Yugoslav and Macedonian football midfielder
Vlatko Kovačević (born 1942), Croatian and Yugoslavian grandmaster of chess
Vlatko Lazić (born 1989), Dutch professional footballer
Vlatko Lozanoski (born 1985), Macedonian singer
Vlatko Maček (1879–1964), politician in the Kingdom of Yugoslavia
Vlatko Marković (born 1937), football player & manager, president of Croatian Football Federation
Vlatko Mitkov (born 1981), Macedonian handball player
Vlatko Nedelkov (born 1985), former Macedonian professional basketball Guard
Vlatko Novakov (born 1978), retired Macedonian football defender
Vlatko Paskačić, 14th century Serbian nobleman
Vlatko Pavletić (1930–2007), Croatian politician and academic
Vlatko Rajković (born 1959), politician in Serbia
Vlatko Ratković (born 1965), politician in Serbia
Vlatko Sokolov (born 1973), Macedonian wrestler
Vlatko Stefanovski, ethno-rock jazz fusion guitar player from Macedonia
Vlatko Stojanovski (born 1997), Macedonian professional footballer
Vlatko Vedral (born 1971), physicist
Vlatko Vladičevski, Macedonian former professional basketball player
Vlatko Vuković, Grand Duke of Hum (died 1392), Bosnian medieval noble

See also
Vlatka
Vlatković
Vlatkovići

References

Slavic masculine given names
Croatian masculine given names
Serbian masculine given names
Bosnian masculine given names
Macedonian masculine given names